Walker's slender snake (Galvarinus attenuatus) is a genus of snake in the family Colubridae.

It is found in Bolivia and Peru.

References 

Galvarinus
Reptiles described in 1945
Reptiles of Bolivia
Reptiles of Peru
Snakes of South America